Bruno Ducol (born 22 March 1949 in Annonay, is a French composer of contemporary music.

References

External links 
 
 Official website
 Discography
 Bruno Ducol (Étude de rythme: Acis et Galaté) (YouTube)

1949 births
Living people
People from Annonay
Academic staff of the Conservatoire de Paris
20th-century French composers
French male composers
20th-century French male musicians